The Honguedo Strait (French: Détroit d'Honguedo) is a strait in eastern Quebec, Canada, flowing between Anticosti Island and the Gaspé Peninsula. It is one of the two outlets of the Saint Lawrence River into its estuary, the Gulf of Saint Lawrence. The other is the Jacques Cartier Strait on the north side of Anticosti Island.

The name Honguedo first appeared in the reports of Jacques Cartier of 1535–1536. In the 16th century, it was known as the Saint-Pierre Strait, especially on maps by Gerardus Mercator (1569) and Cornelius Wytfliet (1597). Only by the 20th century, Honguedo came into use, and in 1934, the Geographic Board of Quebec officially adopted it to commemorate the 400th anniversary of Jacques Cartier's arrival in North America. Yet, the origin of the name is uncertain; it may derive from the Mi'kmaq word for "gathering place", or from the Iroquois word hehonguesto, meaning "one's own nose".

References 

Straits of Quebec
Landforms of Gaspésie–Îles-de-la-Madeleine